Tool Academy (season 1) is the first season of the VH1 reality television series Tool Academy. Tool Academy is a competitive reality television show featuring nine "unsuspecting bad boys" who have been sent to "relationship boot camp". The nine men, all of whom have been nominated by their respective girlfriends, initially think they are taking part in a competition for the title of "Mr. Awesome." However, shortly after arriving they find out the truth: they are actually being entered into a "charm school" which focuses on teaching them how to behave as boyfriends. Each week, one contestant is eliminated and his girlfriend must choose whether or not to stay with him. The last contestant remaining will win a $100,000 prize and the title of "Mr. Awesome." Relationship counselor Trina Dolenz helps the contestants with their relationship problems and decides who is expelled.

The winner of the first season was Josh, who proposed to Ashley after winning the competition, and they got married directly after the graduation ceremony.

A casting call for a second season was announced at the end of the reunion show.

Lesson of the Weeks
Badges
  Communication
  Fidelity
  Humility
  Maturity
  Trust
  Romance
  Family Values
  Commitment

Contestants

 Shawn started the show with Jaimee Grubbs as his girlfriend. However, on episode 2, she was replaced by Aida, his girlfriend of the past six years.
 Rob withdrew from the competition after being medically treated for anxiety over the lie detector challenge.

Episode Progress

 The contestant won Tool Academy and the title "Mr. Awesome"
 The contestant won a challenge and won a date with his girlfriend.
 The contestant was safe from being eliminated.
 The contestant was at risk of being eliminated.
 The contestant was eliminated and his girlfriend decided to stay with him.
 The contestant was eliminated and his girlfriend decided to leave him.
 The contestant withdrew from the competition.
 Clarence (Celebrity) dropped his nickname for episode 2.
 M.E.G.A. won the challenge, but was stated to be eliminated because of his girlfriend.
 Tommy won the challenge, but was eliminated.
 In episode 7, there was no challenge winner.
 Ryan (Matsuflex) dropped his nickname during the final exam.

Episodes

Mr Awesome
First aired January 11, 2009
Lesson of the Week: Communication
Challenge: The girlfriends assemble a bed with the boyfriends reading/giving the instructions.
Challenge Reward: A private date
Challenge Winner: Matsuflex and Jenna
Bottom Three: Dimitri, Rob, Tommy
Eliminated: Dimitri (Jill decided to stay with Dimitri)

Fidelity Challenge
First aired January 18, 2009
Lesson of the Week: Fidelity
Challenge: A tango dance competition after receiving dance lessons. The couples were judged on their ability to "reconnect"
Challenge Reward: Conjugal visit.
Challenge Winner: Matsuflex and Jenna 
Bottom Three: Celebrity, Joey, Shawn
Eliminated: Joey (Ashley L. decided to stay with Joey)

Epic Meltdown of Tools
First aired January 25, 2009
Lesson of the Week: Humility
Challenge: Dress in humiliating outfits and sell cookies to tourists at Universal Studios Hollywood
Challenge Reward: Carriage Ride and Conjugal visit
Challenge Winner: Shawn and Aida 
Bottom Two: Josh and Celebrity
Eliminated: Celebrity (Cameron decided to leave Celebrity)

Husband Material
First aired February 1, 2009
Lesson of the Week: Maturity
Challenge: Knock-down a mastodon with a spear, gather water, and build a shelter
Challenge Reward: Picnic Date
Challenge Winner: M.E.G.A. and Margo
Bottom Two: Shawn and M.E.G.A.
Eliminated: M.E.G.A. (Margo decided to stay with M.E.G.A.)

Episode 5
First aired February 8, 2009
Lesson of the Week: Trust
Challenge: Stay Alive or Stay Dead
Challenge Reward: A date with their girlfriend in a limo and a Conjugal visit
Challenge Winner: Matsuflex and Jenna
Bottom Two: Shawn and Tommy (neither were expelled)
Withdrew: Rob (Karine decided to stay with Rob)

Most Romantic Tool
First aired February 15, 2009
Lesson of the Week: Romance
Challenge: Hold a light heart ornament between their lips
Challenge Reward: First pick of romantic dates
Challenge Winner: Tommy and Krista 
Bottom Two: No One.
Eliminated: Tommy (Krista decided to leave Tommy)

Family Values
First aired March 1, 2009
Lesson of the Week: Family values
Challenge: Take care of a piglet for a period of 24 hours
Bottom Two: None, Shawn was called first and eliminated
Eliminated: Shawn (Aida decided to stay with Shawn)

Two Tools Left
First aired March 8, 2009
Lesson of the Week: Commitment
Challenge: Paint a fence with the couples attached together
Challenge Reward: A romantic dinner
Challenge Winner: Josh and Ashley
Runner-Up: Ryan "Matsuflex" Matsunaga 
Winner:Josh Douglas (Josh and Ashley got married)

Class Reunion
First aired March 15, 2009

The Tool Academy Class of 2009 is back to talk about their future relationships. 
Dimitri and Jill are still together.
Celebrity and Cameron, who broke up after the show, are still separated.
M.E.G.A went to the show alone. Margo did not appear due to family problems, the nature of which M.E.G.A. stated he was unaware of at the time of filming.
Robert and Karine did not appear on the reunion.
Tommy and Krista were back together for the reunion, but after failing a lie detector test to determine if he was cheating, Krista and Tommy fought and Krista left him again.
Shawn admits to being a tool and is no longer with Aida or Jaimee.
A surprise guest, Heather, appears on the show saying she's expecting Shawn's baby and is four months pregnant and does not want Shawn to be around her or the baby.
Matsuflex's and Jenna's relationship has finally become sexual.
Matsuflex states he is the man on the Tool Academy's banner.
Matsuflex says he prefers "Matsuflex" over "Ryan" again.
Josh and Ashley are still happily married.
At the end of the show, the winning couple, Josh and Ashley, are awarded the $100,000 prize.

References

External links
Tool Academy Official Website
Famous VH1 Friends: Tool Academy
VH1 Press Release
OC Register Article about Ryan Matsunaga

2009 American television seasons